Moodupadam is a 1963 Malayalam language film directed by Ramu Kariat and scripted by K. T. Muhammed based on S. K. Pottekkatt's novel of the same name. Sathyan and Ambika play the lead roles. It is a social film about the relationship between three major religious faiths in Kerala, Hindu, Muslim and Christian.

Cast

 Sathyan
 Nellikkodu Bhaskaran
 Premji
 K. Balakrishna Menon
 Madhu
 Adoor Bhasi
 Velayudhan Nair
 Kuthiravattom Pappu
 Kunjava
 Kedamangalam Ali
 Muhammad
 Sinhalan
 R. S. Prabhu
 Velayudhan
 Vaidyanathan
 Ramesh
 Abdul Khader
 Master Hudh
 Master Soman
 Ambika Sukumaran
 Sheela
 Prema 
 Shantha
 Rajam
 Kozhikode Shantha Devi
 K. P. Malathi
 Latha Raju credited as Baby Latha
 Baby Vilasini

Crew
 Art direction: S. Konnanadu
 Sound: V. Sivaram, V. B. C. Menon (in Westrex Sound system)
 Makeup: K. V. Bhaskaran
 Costumes: V. M. Muthu
 Filming studios: Vijaya, Vauhini
 Outdoor Unit: Devi Sound Service
 Lab: Vijaya Lab
 Processing: P. M. Vijayaraghavalu
 Stills: Trichy K. Arunachalam
 Production manager: P. A. Backer
 Production executive: R. S. Prabhu

Soundtrack 
The music was composed by M. S. Baburaj and the lyrics were written by P. Bhaskaran and Yusufali Kechery.

References

External links
 Moodupadam at the Malayalam Movie Database

1960s Malayalam-language films
Films based on Indian novels
Films directed by Ramu Kariat